Roden Cutler House is a skyscraper in Sydney, New South Wales, Australia. It consists of 19 floors primarily office/commercial space. Construction finished in 1975 and it is located at 24 Campbell Street, Sydney. The Antenna height is 112m and the structure height is 108m. The building is owned by Ausgrid and the lower floors house the City South substation.

The building is named after Sir Roden Cutler, the longest-serving Governor of New South Wales and a Victoria Cross recipient. Roden Cutler won the Victoria Cross in the 1941 Syrian campaign where he was wounded, requiring the amputation of a leg.

Skyscrapers in Sydney
Office buildings in Sydney
Skyscraper office buildings in Australia
Sydney central business district